Chatfield High School is a high school located in an unincorporated area of Jefferson County near Littleton, Colorado, United States. It is part of the Jefferson County Public Schools system.

History
Chatfield Senior High School opened in the fall of 1985; there was no senior class its first year. The school's first graduating class was the Class of 1987. During reconstruction of Columbine High School, and also after the Columbine High School massacre, Columbine students attended classes at Chatfield.

Attendance zone
Areas within the school's attendance zone include: Ken Caryl CDP

Extracurricular activities

Athletics 
Chatfield has produced well-known athletes such as twin brothers Taylor Rogers and Tyler Rogers, LenDale White, Ryan Vena, Katie Hnida, and Zac Robinson. In 2001 Chatfield's football team went undefeated, winning the JeffCo and State Championships and ending the season ranked 11th in the nation.

Chatfield's athletic rival is Columbine High School.

Performing arts and other activities 
Chatfield has been "nationally recognized as an outstanding theatre school", known for putting on ambitious productions such as Mary Zimmerman's Metamorphoses (play), in which students constructed and used a swimming pool onstage. Chatfield's Troupe #4126 has made consistent appearances at the JeffCo Theatre Festival and the Colorado Thespian Conference.

Chatfield's  choir program has participated in JeffCo All County Honor Choir and the Colorado All State Choir.

Awards and recognition 
Chatfield's pom squad won 1st in league for the 2006–2007 year as well as 3rd at the NDA nationals in Florida.

In 2009, the Lady Chargers varsity soccer team took state.

Chatfield's improv troupe won the Critic's Choice and performed on the main stage at the 54th Thespian Conference on December 8, 2018.

Notable alumni

 Dian Bachar – actor
 Katie Hnida – football player
 Zac Robinson – football player
 Tyler Sturdevant – baseball player
 Ryan Vena – football player
 LenDale White – football player, USC and Denver Broncos
 Taylor Rogers – MLB pitcher for the Minnesota Twins
 Tyler Rogers – MLB pitcher for the San Francisco Giants
Dalton Keene - football player for the New England Patriots
Brittany Pettersen - U.S. House of Representatives

References

 http://usatoday30.usatoday.com/sports/preps/football/01super25.htm

External links

Public high schools in Colorado
Educational institutions established in 1985
Jefferson County Public Schools (Colorado)
Littleton, Colorado
Schools in Jefferson County, Colorado
1985 establishments in Colorado